In enzymology, a precorrin-4 C11-methyltransferase is an enzyme that catalyzes the chemical reaction

S-adenosyl-L-methionine + precorrin-4  S-adenosyl-L-homocysteine + precorrin-5

The two substrates of this enzyme are S-adenosyl methionine and precorrin 4; its two products are S-adenosylhomocysteine and precorrin 5.

This enzyme belongs to the family of transferases, specifically those transferring one-carbon group methyltransferases.  The systematic name of this enzyme class is S-adenosyl-L-methionine:precorrin-4 C11 methyltransferase. Other names in common use include precorrin-3 methylase, and CobM.  It is part of the biosynthetic pathway to cobalamin (vitamin B12) in aerobic bacteria.

See also
 Cobalamin biosynthesis

Structural studies

References

 
 

EC 2.1.1
Enzymes of known structure